Saving Mes Aynak is a 2014 independent documentary film, directed, produced, shot and edited by Brent E. Huffman. It was produced out of Kartemquin Films, the landmark Chicago-based documentary house, along with producer Zak Piper.

It focuses on Afghan archaeologist Qadir Temori and his struggle to save Mes Aynak, a 5,000-year-old archaeological site in Afghanistan which faces demolition. Saving Mes Aynak was the 2014 recipient of a MacArthur Foundation Grant in 2014.

Saving Mes Aynak premiered at the International Documentary Film Festival Amsterdam in November 2014. It later aired on Al Jazeera America and Al Jazeera English networks in July 2015 and was also broadcast on multiple other networks in various countries. In 2016, Saving Mes Aynak premiered on Netflix.

"Saving Mes Aynak" has won over 30 major awards and has been broadcast on television in over 70 countries. It can currently be seen on Netflix, iTunes, Amazon, Google Play and on Special Edition DVD with Icarus Films. The film was directed by Brent E. Huffman. He was awarded The International Academic Forum Documentary Film Award and Reva and David Logan Foundation Grant in 2015 in part for his work on the film.

Synopsis
Saving Mes Aynak examines the archaeological site of Mes Aynak. Though 90% of the site has yet to be excavated, it is threatened by a Chinese state-owned mining company. The copper mining planned there would completely demolish the archaeological site, as well as the surrounding mountain range. Qadir Temori and other Afghan archaeologists must rally against not only the Chinese government, but also the Taliban and local politics to save the historic site.

Save Mes Aynak Day
The filmmakers of Saving Mes Aynak created a "Save Mes Aynak Day" on July 1, 2015 in efforts to promote the preservation of Mes Aynak and the film. The film's director, Brent Huffman, met with Afghan leaders and presented them with a petition signed by 100,000 people favoring site preservation. Huffman also provided the leaders with copies of the film.

Awards and festivals 

Saving Mes Aynak continues to screen in theaters, museums, universities across the globe—to the Louvre, Museum of World Culture in Sweden, The National Museum of the Czech Republic, the Rubin Museum of Art NYC, Seattle Art Museum — educating the public across the globe on the issues of cultural heritage, struggles and devotion of archaeologists.

References

Further reading

External links 
 
 German Camera Productions
 Saving Mes Aynak Facebook Page
 Saving Mes Aynak Twitter Page
 Kartemquin Films
 
 "Full Frame Coverage: Saving Mes Aynak". Indie Pulse.

2014 documentary films
Documentary films about Afghanistan
Documentary films about mining
Kartemquin Films films
2010s English-language films
2010s American films